Mohd Shahrul Aizad bin Zukifli (born 26 March 1993), commonly known as Cotang, is a Malaysian professional footballer who plays for Sri Pahang in Malaysia Super League as a left winger.

Career statistics

Club

References

External links
 

1993 births
Living people
Malaysian footballers
Malaysia Super League players
Sri Pahang FC players
Kuantan FA players
Terengganu FC players
Association football midfielders
Association football wingers
Malaysian people of Malay descent